The Ven.  Henry Wetherell was  Archdeacon of Hereford from 1825 to 1852.

Born in 1775, he was educated at Magdalen College, Oxford. He was elected a Fellow at University College, Oxford in 1802 and was  Chaplain to the Duke of Kent until 1820. He held incumbencies at Thruxton, Kentchurch and Kingstone.

He died on 23 December 1857.

Notes

1775 births
People from Oxford
Alumni of Magdalen College, Oxford
Fellows of University College, Oxford
Archdeacons of Hereford
1857 deaths